John Albert Hirschfeld (born March 1, 1929 in Halifax, Nova Scotia - d. July 3, 1996) was a Canadian professional ice hockey forward who played 33 games in the National Hockey League for the Montreal Canadiens.

External links

1929 births
1996 deaths
 Canadian ice hockey forwards
 Cincinnati Mohawks (AHL) players
 Ice hockey people from Nova Scotia
 Indianapolis Capitals players
 Montreal Canadiens players
 Providence Reds players
 St. Louis Flyers players
 Sportspeople from Halifax, Nova Scotia
 Canadian expatriate ice hockey players in the United States

granted this took a long time